Three Wonderful Days (German: Drei wunderschöne Tage) is a 1939 German drama film directed by Fritz Kirchhoff and starring Gustav Waldau, Gina Falckenberg and Hans Zesch-Ballot.

Cast

References

Bibliography 
 Parish, James Robert. Film Actors Guide. Scarecrow Press, 1977.

External links 
 

1939 films
Films of Nazi Germany
German drama films
1939 drama films
1930s German-language films
Films directed by Fritz Kirchhoff
Bavaria Film films
German black-and-white films
1930s German films